The Affair is the sixteenth book in the Jack Reacher series written by Lee Child but is a prequel set chronologically before most of them. It was published on 29 September 2011 in the United Kingdom and was published on 27 September 2011 in the USA. The Affair is a prequel set six months before Child's first novel, Killing Floor and setting out the explosive circumstances under which Reacher's career in the United States Army was terminated. This book is written in the first person.

Plot
In March 1997, Major Jack Reacher is briefed by his superior Colonel Leon Garber on a troubling development in Carter's Crossing, Mississippi: a woman has been found murdered, her throat slit, with signs of rape, and the military is concerned that one of the potential suspects seems to be Captain Reed Riley, a commander at Fort Kelham, a nearby Army Ranger base, with a reputation as a ladykiller. Garber informs Reacher that another MP, Major Duncan Munro, has been assigned to investigate the murder; his job is to go undercover and ensure that Munro's investigation doesn't damage the military's public image. He also puts Reacher in touch with Col. James John Frazer, a Senate liaison who warns Reacher that Reed's father, Senator Carlton Riley, a member of the Armed Services Committee, is threatening to impose harsh budget cuts on the army if his son is targeted.

Posing as a drifter, Reacher takes up residence in a local inn and goes for a meal, where he meets the local sheriff, Elizabeth Deveraux. A former Marine MP, she quickly deduces Reacher's true identity and purpose, but permits him to stay as long as he doesn't interfere with her investigation. Reacher does so anyway, and learns that the dead woman, Janice Chapman, was the third woman murdered in Carter's Crossing in just the last few months; the other two were young women from the poorer, largely African American section of town. Reacher's old friend Sergeant Frances Neagley arrives with a warning to stay away from Deveraux, who she claims was dishonorably discharged from the service following an incident with a fellow Marine, but Jack disregards her advice.

As it becomes increasingly clear that Riley did in fact have something to do with Chapman's death and possibly the other two murders, Jack is ordered to cover up the evidence he's found this far, which he ignores. After a journalist investigating the closure of Fort Kelham (under Munro's orders to avoid compromising the case) and the younger brother of one of the murdered women is shot and killed, Jack discovers that an independent militia from Tennessee has been assigned by someone inside the chain of command to destroy evidence of the murders, while Munro confirms that none of the other soldiers at Kelham, aside from Riley, could have committed the crime.

Jack and Deveraux grow close, and have sex at the inn. When the mother of the dead boy commits suicide by standing in front of a moving train, he travels to the Pentagon and confronts Frazer, having realized that he had a personal interest in protecting the army's relationship with Senator Riley. Frazer tries to kill Jack with a hammer, but Jack breaks his spine. Neagley arranges for the death to be labeled an accident, and takes Reacher to Garber, who provides him with a confidential file painting Deveraux as a sociopath who broke the arm of a woman named Alice Bouton out of jealousy. Garber explains that the military is content to blame her for the murders, but since they have no jurisdiction on domestic soil, it has been decided to instead shut down the investigation and turn the matter over to local authorities. Reacher is told that if he agrees to drop the matter, his job will be secure, but he's allowed to leave with the file anyway.

To celebrate Reed's exoneration, his father organizes a visit to Carter's Crossing and Fort Kelham. Reacher learns something interesting: "Janice Chapman" was an assumed identity, and that the victim is really Audrey Shaw, a former intern for Senator Riley who was paid to leave her position after having an affair with the senator. He also deduces that the other women were also involved with Reed at different times, and may have become pregnant, which would have tarnished his reputation. After subduing a team of unarmed artillerymen sent to arrest him for violating orders, he and Munro work to separate the Rileys from the rest of the partygoers, allowing Reacher to take them hostage. At gunpoint, Senator Riley confesses what Reacher already knew: Deveraux's file was forged to clear his son, Reed did murder the first two women, and then killed Chapman for the fun of it. Reacher then breaks Reed's neck, and does the same for his father, before leaving them in a car to be run over by an oncoming train.

To protect the army, Reacher invents a story that the Rileys were killed in an accident, and that the militia was responsible for the murders. Nevertheless, Garber informs Reacher that his actions have put him on the "shit list", meaning he will never be promoted or allowed to return to active duty. Reacher decides to resign from the service, and hitchhikes for the first time, setting up the events of Killing Floor.

External links 

 The Affair - leechild.com
 The Affair - NYTimes

References 

2011 British novels
English novels
Jack Reacher books
Prequel novels
First-person narrative novels
Bantam Press books

sv:Värt att dö för (bok)